The Golden Gate or Gate of Mercy is the only eastern gate of the Temple Mount, and one of only two Gates of the Old City of Jerusalem that used to offer access into the city from the East side.  

The gate has been sealed since the Middle Ages. Its interior can be accessed from the Temple Mount. 

In Jewish tradition, the Messiah will enter Jerusalem through this gate, coming from the Mount of Olives. Christians and Muslims generally believe that this was the gate through which Jesus entered Jerusalem.

Names
Each of the two doors of this double-gate has its own name: Bab al-Rahma, "Gate of Mercy", for the southern one, and Bab al-Taubah, the "Gate of Repentance", for the northern one.  

Another Arabic name is the Gate of Eternal Life.  

In the Mishnah (Middot 1:3), the eastern gate of the Second Temple compound is called the Shushan Gate (שער שושן). If the Golden Gate does preserve the location of the Shushan Gate, which is only a presumption with no archaeological proof, this would make it the oldest of the current gates in Jerusalem's Old City Walls. Jewish and Christian tradition attributes its construction to King Solomon, but there is no archaeological or historical evidence of its being that old. The modern Hebrew name of the Golden Gate is Sha'ar HaRachamim (שער הרחמים).

History

Early history
The Golden Gate is located in the northern third of the Temple Mount's Eastern Wall. The eastern wall now visible was built in at least four stages, during the reign of Hezekiah, during the time of Zerubbabel, in the Hasmonean period and famously in the Herodian period. The present Golden Gate is thought to have been built on top of ruins of an earlier gate in the Eastern Wall. An arch, most possibly of a former gate, lies directly beneath the blocked entranceway of the Golden Gate.

The 1st-century historian, Josephus, mentions an "eastern gate" in his Antiquities of the Jews, and makes note of the fact that this gate was considered within the far northeastern extremity of the inner sacred court. The Mishnah mentions a former causeway which led out of the Temple Mount eastward over the Kidron valley, extending as far as the Mount of Olives. Rabbi Eliezer, dissenting, says that it was not a causeway, but rather marble pillars over which cedar boards had been laid, used by the High Priest and his entourage. This gate, known as the Shushan Gate, was not used by the masses to enter the Temple Mount, but reserved only for the High Priest and all those that aided him when taking out the Red Heifer or the scapegoat on Yom Kippur.

The present gate 
The construction date of the present-day Golden Gate is unknown, as Muslim authorities forbid archaeological work at the Temple Mount. The vast majority of the 19th and early 20th century scholars such as Robinson, Conder, Bartlett, Vincent and Abel, Melchior de Vogüé and Creswell dated the gate to different periods prior to the Islamic period. Later, in the light of developing research, new arguments have been advanced by many scholars such as Hamilton, Sharon, Ben-Dov, Rozen Ayalon, Tsafrir and Wilkinson that the gate should be dated to the 7th–8th century AD, to the Umayyad period. Today, opinions are shared between a late Byzantine and an early Umayyad date.

According to some scholars, the present gate was built circa 520 CE, during the Byzantine period, as part of Justinian I's building program in Jerusalem, on top of the ruins of the earlier gate in the wall. An alternative theory holds that it was built in the later part of the 7th century by Byzantine artisans employed by the Umayyad Caliphs. 

Dutch archaeologist Leen Ritmeyer, who explored the gate in the 1970s, reached the conclusion that the two monolithic massive gateposts seen on the inside of the gate belong to an old structure of the gate, thought to be the Shushan Gate (mentioned in Mishnah Middot 1:3 as being the only gate in the Eastern Wall), and that it dates from the First Temple period. Philosopher Maimonides wrote in his Code of Jewish Law that, during the time of the Second Temple, "one entering from the East Gate of the Temple Mount would walk on level ground till the end of the Rampart. From the Rampart he would ascend 12 steps to the Court of Women, the height of each step being half a cubit and its tread half a cubit."

The sealing of the gate

Closed by the Muslims in 810, reopened in 1102 by the Crusaders, it was walled up by Saladin after regaining Jerusalem in 1187. Ottoman Sultan Suleiman the Magnificent rebuilt it together with the city walls, but walled it up in 1541, and it stayed that way.

Suleiman may have taken this decision purely for defensive reasons, but in Jewish tradition this is the gate through which the Anointed One (Messiah) will enter Jerusalem. In relation to the Muslim belief Jesus of Nazareth is the Messiah, it is suggested  that Suleiman the Magnificent sealed off the Golden Gate to prevent a false Messiah or "Antichrist" coming through the entrance.  The Ottomans also built a cemetery in front of the gate to prevent a false precursor to the Anointed One, Elijah, from passing through the gate.   This belief was based upon two premises.  First, according to Islamic teaching Elijah is a descendant of  Aaron, making him a priest or kohen. Second, that a Jewish kohen is not permitted to enter a cemetery. This second premise is not wholly correct because a Kohen is permitted to enter a cemetery in which either Jews or non-Jews are buried, such as the one outside the Golden Gate, as long as certain laws or Halakha regarding purity are followed.

Ottoman Era 

During the Ottoman era, the inner recess (vestibule) built within the western side of the Golden Gate was used for brick burning, which bricks were then used to renovate buildings and structures in the Haram esh-Sharif (Temple Mount enclosure). A small mosque was built near the Golden Gate to cater to the brick burners, but which was later destroyed, along with part of the Gate's wall, by order of the Sultan in the 19th-century in order to make room for renovations. A new wall and two new arches were added to the Gate's western interior. The gate house, which is accessed from the Temple Mount by descending a wide flight of stairs leading into it, and where the current ground floor is built in the shape of a rectangle measuring  x  (exterior wall measurements), is surrounded by walls, the length of which space being divided by a row of columns forming two equal divisions. At the ground level can be seen the top of an ancient arch (the lower stones still buried underground), the existence of which leads to the conclusion that the original ground level was much lower than what it is today.

The Ottoman Turks transformed the walled-up gate into a watchtower.

Modern history 
Access to the Golden Gate from within the Temple Mount was sealed off by Israeli authorities in 2003 because the group managing the area had ties to Hamas. The gate was kept closed in order to stop illegal construction work there by the Islamic Waqf. Israeli officials believe the work led to the destruction of antiquities from periods of Jewish presence in the area.

In February 2019, the interior of the gate was reopened for Muslim worshipers from the Temple Mount. However, the gate itself still remains sealed.

Description 
The Golden Gate represents a rectangular stonework structure with two decorated facades. Unlike other gates in al-Aqsa enclave, the eastern façade was not built as part of the wall of the enclave, but was shifted 2.00 meters out off the wall. 

The Golden Gate is a double gate. The two bays are reflected in its plan and main elevations; two doorways are followed by a double passage covered by three pairs of domes. On the ground floor level a vaulted hall is divided by four columns into two aisles, which lead to the Door of Mercy, Bab al-Rahma, and the Door of Repentance, Bab al-Taubah; an upper floor room has the two roof domes as its ceiling.

Originally, the eastern facade of the Golden Gate has two large doorways, separated by a column. Each doorway measures 3.90 metres in width, supporting a semicircular arch with a decorated frieze. The doorways in the eastern facade were blocked up in the Ottoman period. It is noticed that some features in the decoration of the Golden Gate bear a close resemblance to the decoration in other non-Muslim buildings that existed in the Levant.

At that time, the hall consisted of six shallow domes, which have elliptical shape, two of which were changed later. These domes are separated by arches of an elliptical shape springing from two pilasters at the entrances and two central columns. Each dome in the Golden Gate is constructed over a square plan, so special stones are required to form the successive stone circles that form the dome. Architecturally, the spatial treatment of the gate is somewhat interesting; shifting the facade 2 metres out of the wall indicates a clear definition of its location. The most important question concerning this gate is the matter of motive.

Symbolism
Since the early times of Muslim rule over the holy region Bayt al-Maqdis, some Muslims, such as ‘Ubadah ibn al-Samit, linked the eastern wall of the enclave with the Last Day. According to Ibn Kathir, this wall is not the wall mentioned in the Quranic verse “so a wall will be put up betwixt them, with a gate therein” [57:13], but it was mentioned by some commentators as an example for the clarification of the meaning of the verse. Since that time, this example probably encouraged Muslims to bury their dead immediately outside the eastern wall of the al-Aqsa enclave. In any case, if the name “al-Rahmah” (Mercy) truly exists since the construction of the gate, this suggests that the gate is part of an overall concept based on the idea related to the place, specifically the Rock, as that of the Last Day. Then it can be argued that Bab al-Rahmah symbolises a gate in paradise or an entry to Mercy (Ratrout, 2004, p. 293). Whatever the construction motive of Bab al-Rahmah might have been, it was built during the early Islamic period, and it is the most significant gate of the enclave.

According to Jewish tradition, the Shekhinah (שכינה) (Divine Presence) used to appear through the eastern Gate, and will appear again when the Anointed One (Messiah) comes (Ezekiel 44:1–3) and a new gate replaces the present one; that might be why Jews used to pray in medieval times for mercy at the former gate at this location, another possible reason being that in the Crusader period, when this habit was first documented, they were not allowed into the city where the Western Wall is located. Hence the name "Gate of Mercy".

In Christian apocryphal texts, the gate was the scene of the meeting between the parents of Mary, so that the gate became the symbol of the Immaculate Conception of Mary and Joachim and Anne Meeting at the Golden Gate became a standard subject in cycles depicting the Life of the Virgin. It is also said that Jesus, riding on a donkey, passed through this gate on Palm Sunday, in fulfillment of the Jewish prophecy concerning the Messiah. The Synoptic Gospels appear to support this belief by indicating Jesus came down from the direction of the Mount of Olives and immediately arrived at the Temple Mount. The Gospel of John alternatively suggests the Pharisees were watching the arrival, possibly from the Temple Mount. Some equate it with the Beautiful Gate mentioned in Acts 3.

In Christian culture

Honoring the Jewish tradition (see above) and inspired by apocryphal accounts of the life of the Virgin Mary, medieval Christian artists depicted the relationship of Jesus' maternal grandparents Joachim and Anne Meeting at the Golden Gate. The couple came to represent the Christian ideal of chastity in conjugal relations within marriage. The pious custom of a bridegroom carrying his bride across the threshold of their marital home may be based in the traditional symbolism of the Golden Gate to the faithful. In early medieval art, the now-formal tenet of the immaculate conception of the mother of Christ was commonly depicted in a form known in Italian as the Metterza: the three generations of grandmother, mother, and son.

The metaphor also features heavily in the personalist phenomenology of Pope John Paul II, his Theology of the Body, a collection of reflections on this theme Crossing the Threshold of Hope were written to encourage the Roman Catholic faithful facing the challenges of materialism and increasing secularism and published on the cusp of the new millennium in 1998. The threshold between the earthly and heavenly realms symbolized by the Golden Gate represents the Mystical Body of the Church, often viewed as the Bride of Christ.

In Christian eschatology, sunrise in the east symbolizes both Christ's resurrection at dawn on Easter Sunday and the direction of his Second Coming. Sanctuaries for Christian congregational worship at an altar are often arranged with respect to the east. City gates in Christian urban centers often contain religious artifacts intended to guard the city from attacks and to bless travelers. The Ostra Brama in Vilnius, Lithuania contains an icon of Our Lady of the Gate of Dawn, which is venerated by both Roman Catholic and Orthodox inhabitants.

Topography east of the Old City 
The Golden Gate is one of the few sealed gates in Jerusalem's Old City Walls, along with the Huldah Gates, and a small Biblical and Crusader-era postern located several stories above ground on the southern side of the eastern wall.

References

External links 
 
 Golden Gate (Jerusalem). Madain Project
 The Golden Gate of the Temple Mount in Jerusalem. Ritmeyer Archaeological Design
 Israeli history photo of the week: The Golden Gate. The Jerusalem Post, October 6, 2011. Three photos from the American Colony collection in the Library of Congress
Photos of the Golden Gate at the Manar al-Athar photo archive

Buildings and structures completed in the 6th century
Gates in Jerusalem's Old City Walls
Temple Mount
Jewish law and rituals
Historic sites in Jerusalem